Lyudmila Pavlovna Suslina (born 5 October 1946) is a Russian former pair skater who represented the Soviet Union. With Alexander Tikhomirov, she is the 1968 Winter Universiade bronze medalist. The pair also won silver at the 1967 Blue Swords, silver at the 1967 Prize of Moscow News, and gold at the 1968 Blue Swords.

References 

1946 births
Russian female pair skaters
Soviet female pair skaters
Living people
Figure skaters from Moscow
Universiade medalists in figure skating
Universiade bronze medalists for the Soviet Union
Competitors at the 1968 Winter Universiade